Jagharq (also Romanized as Jāgharq and Jā Gharq; also known as Jāgharg and Jāqarq) is a village in Jagharq Rural District, Torqabeh District, Torqabeh and Shandiz County, Razavi Khorasan Province, Iran. At the 2006 census, its population was 2,044, in 542 families.

References 

Populated places in Torqabeh and Shandiz County